Southern Foodways Alliance (SFA)  is an institute of the Center for the Study of Southern Culture at the University of Mississippi, dedicated to the documentation, study and exploration of the foodways of the American South. Member-funded, it stages events, recognizes culinary contributions with awards and a hall of fame, produces documentary films, publishes writing, and maps the region’s culinary institutions recording oral history interviews. The group has about 800 members, a mixture of chefs, academics, writers, and eaters.

Founders and Board
John T. Edge, a writer and commentator, has served as the director of the SFA since its foundation in 1999. A journalist, John Egerton, was one of the group's founders. In 2007, the SFA established the John Egerton Prize  to recognize annually selected "artists, writers, scholars, and others—including artisans and farmers—whose work in the American South addresses issues of race, class, gender, and social and environmental justice, through the lens of food." John Martin Taylor was also a founding member. Current board members include Francis Lam and Rob Long.

Annual awards
The annual Ruth Fertel Keeper of the Flame Award is made jointly by the Southern Foodways Alliance and the Fertel Foundation, and honors an unsung hero or heroine who has made a great contribution to food. The award was first made in 2000. The honoree receives a monetary award and a documentary film is made about them.

Claiborne Award recipients:
2019 Ann Abadie
2018 Marcie Cohen Ferris
2017 Hugo Ortega
2016 Ira Wallace
2015 JoAnn Clevenger
2014 Sandor Katz
2013 Vertamae Grosvenor
2012 Ben and Karen Barker
2011 Dori Sanders
2010 Christiane Lauterbach
2009 Ronni Lundy
2008 John Folse
2007 Allan Benton
2006 Frank Stitt
2005 Joe Dabney
2004 Nathalie Dupree and Jessica B. Harris
2003 John Egerton
2002 Ella Brennan
2001 Marie Rudisill
2000 Leah Chase
1999 Edna Lewis

Reception
In the Atlantic Monthly, Corby Kummer described the SFA as: “this country’s most intellectually engaged (and probably most engaging) food society."

References

External links
Southern Foodways Alliance website
Documentary on own website

University of Mississippi
Cultural studies organizations
American food and drink organizations
Organizations established in 1999
1999 establishments in Mississippi